Đa Mi is a rural commune in Hàm Thuận Bắc District of Bình Thuận Province, Vietnam. The area is 145,38 km², and in 2001 the population was 2,774. It is mainly notable as the site of the first of the dams and hydroelectric power stations of the Hàm Thuận - Đa Mi Hydroelectric Power Complex.

References

Populated places in Bình Thuận province